Eyvind Alnæs (29 April 1872 – 24 December 1932) was a Norwegian composer, pianist, organist and choir director.

Personal life
Alnæs was born in Fredrikstad, as the son of headmaster  Johannes Jørgen Lauritz Alnæs (1835–1916) and Elise Martine Hansen (1851–1931). He married Emilie Thorne  (1882–1976) in 1903. He was the father of author Lise Børsum, and grandfather of novelist Finn Alnæs and artist Bente Børsum.

Career
In 1888 he was enrolled at the Music and Organist School in Oslo (Musikkonservatoriet i Oslo). Alnæs studied  piano with Westye Waaler, organ with Peter Brynie Lindeman as well as harmony, counterpoint and composition  with Iver Holter. In April 1892, after Alnæs had finished his studies in Oslo, he studied in Leipzig with Carl Reinecke and, after the première of his first symphony in 1896, in Berlin with Julius Ruthardt.

For many years he played the organ in several churches and conducted choirs. During the years 1895-1907 he was organist at Bragernes Church in Drammen. From 1907-16 he was at  Uranienborg Church in Oslo and between 1916-32  at Oslo Cathedral.  He helped found the Norwegian Composer's Union (Norsk Komponistforening)  in 1917 and served as chairman from 1921-23.
Alnæs wrote music in a late Romantic style;  his output included two symphonies, one set of symphonic variations, a piano concerto, pieces for piano, chorale preludes for organ, choral works, and art songs (in Norwegian, romanser).

Discography
A number of songs by Alnæs have been recorded by the likes of Kirsten Flagstad and Feodor Chaliapin. In 2007 the first recording of Alnæs's Piano Concerto in D major, Op. 27 (published c. 1919)  was released; it featured Piers Lane as the piano soloist and the Bergen Philharmonic Orchestra conducted by Andrew Litton.  In early 2010 the premiere recording of his two symphonies - no.1 in C minor, Op.7 and no.2 in D major, Op.43 - was released, with the Latvian National Symphony Orchestra conducted by Terje Mikkelsen.

Alnæs received the King's Medal of Merit (Kongens fortjenstmedalje) in gold in 1922, and in 1932 was appointed a Knight 1st Class in the Order of St. Olav.

He died in 1932 and was buried at Vestre gravlund cemetery in the Frogner borough of Oslo.

References

External links

Brief biography from Norwegian Melodies

1872 births
1932 deaths
19th-century classical composers
19th-century conductors (music)
19th-century Norwegian composers
19th-century Norwegian organists
20th-century classical composers
20th-century conductors (music)
20th-century Norwegian male musicians
20th-century Norwegian composers
20th-century Norwegian organists
Burials at Vestre gravlund
Male conductors (music)
Male classical organists
Norwegian classical composers
Norwegian classical organists
Norwegian conductors (music)
Norwegian male classical composers
Norwegian Romantic composers
Oslo Conservatory of Music alumni
Musicians from Fredrikstad
Recipients of the King's Medal of Merit
Recipients of the St. Olav's Medal